The 2012 Three Days of De Panne is the 36th edition of the Three Days of De Panne, an annual bicycle race. Taking part in and around the De Panne region of West Flanders, it began in Middelkerke on 27 March and will finish in De Panne two days later. The 544.5 km long stage race contains four stages, with two held on the final day. It is part of the 2012 UCI Europe Tour and is rated as a 2.HC event.

Teams
24 teams were invited to participate in the tour: 10 UCI ProTeams and 14 UCI Professional Continental Teams.

Stages

Stage 1
27 March 2011 – Middelkerke to Oudenaarde,

Stage 2
28 March 2012 – Zottegem to Koksijde,

Stage 3a
29 March 2012 – De Panne to De Panne,

Stage 3b
29 March 2012 – De Panne to Koksijde to De Panne,  individual time trial (ITT)

Classification leadership

Final standings

References
General

Specific

External links
Three Days of De Panne homepage

Three Days of Bruges–De Panne
Three
Three Days of De Panne